Peacemarsh is a section of the town of Gillingham in the north of the county of Dorset. It lies on the northern side of Gillingham, on the B3095 about 4 miles south of the A303. A neighbouring village is Milton on Stour. Other areas of Gillingham include Wyke and Bay.

Peacemarsh is in the census area of Gillingham which has a population of 9,323.

One of the local employers in Peacemarsh is Neal's Yard Remedies.

References

Villages in Dorset
Gillingham, Dorset